Three ships of the United States Navy have borne the name USS Portland, named in honor of the cities of Portland, Maine, and Portland, Oregon.

  was a  heavy cruiser, launched in 1932 and struck in 1959
  is a  launched 13 February 2016

See also
 

United States Navy ship names